Emamzadeh Mohammad (also Romanized as Emāmzādeh Moḩammad; also known as Shāhzādeh Moḩammad) is a village in Howmeh Rural District, in the Central District of Behbahan County, Khuzestan Province, Iran. At the 2006 census, its population was 32, in 7 families.

References 

Populated places in Behbahan County